Boos is a surname. Notable people with the surname include:

Carl Boos (1806–1883), German architect
Georgi Boos, former governor of Kaliningrad Oblast of Russia
Martin Boos, evangelical Roman Catholic theologian
Tino Boos (born 1975), German ice hockey player
Charles de Boos (1819–1900), Australian writer